Nina Stojanović was the defending champion but chose to compete at the 2021 Torneig Internacional Els Gorchs instead.

Chloé Paquet won the title, defeating Simona Waltert in the final, 6–4, 6–3.

Seeds

Draw

Finals

Top half

Bottom half

References

Main Draw

Internationaux Féminins de la Vienne - Singles